SSR College of Arts, Commerce and Science, is a general degree college situated in Silvassa, Dadra and Nagar Haveli and Daman and Diu. It was established in the year 2006. The college is affiliated with Pune University.

The Name SSR is the abbreviation of 'Svargiya Sanjhibhai Rupjhibai'. Sanjhibhai Rupjhibhai Delkar was the former MP of Dadra and Nagar Haveli and father of Mohanbhai Sanjibhai Delkar, the founder SSR Memorial trust, under which this college runs. 
The local administration has attempted to demolish the SSR College accommodation buildings housing 300 students. SSR Memorial Trustee Abhinav Delkar, the son of Mohan Delkar, stated that "over 350 police personnel had turned up outside our college with bulldozers on June 27, 2020 to demolish the structure. They stopped only when my father managed to get a stay from the court". 
On 11 March 2021 a senior Marine Drive police officer told the Times of India, "Some people were allegedly trying to destabilise a college trust property of Delkar’s, and were demanding money from him and pressurising him to induct certain people as trustees".

Departments

Science

B.Sc.
Physics
Chemistry
Mathematics
Botany
Zoology
Microbiology
Computer Science

M.Sc
Organic Chemistry

Arts 
English
History
Psychology
Political Science

Commerce

B.Com
Business Administration
Cost Accounting
Business Finance

BBA
Marketing
Humen Resources 
finance

BCA

M Com
Business Administration

Accreditation
The college is recognized by the University Grants Commission (UGC).
The college is accredited by NAAC with B+ Grade

References

External links

Universities and colleges in Dadra and Nagar Haveli and Daman and Diu
Educational institutions established in 2006
2006 establishments in Dadra and Nagar Haveli
Silvassa